Ivan Petrovich Novoseltsev (born January 23, 1979) is a Russian former professional ice hockey winger. He is the uncle of Vladislav Namestnikov.

Playing career
As a youth, Novoseltsev played in the 1993 Quebec International Pee-Wee Hockey Tournament with a team from Moscow.

Novoseltsev was drafted in the fourth round, 95th overall, by the Florida Panthers in the 1997 NHL Entry Draft. Drafted from the Russian Superleague's Krylya Sovetov Moscow, Novoseltsev made his North American debut with the Sarnia Sting of the Ontario Hockey League during the 1997–98 season.  In the 1998–99 OHL season, he finished with 96 points to rank in the league's top ten in scoring.

Novoseltsev made his National Hockey League debut with the Panthers during the 1999–2000 season and spent parts of five seasons with the team.  During the 2003–04 season he was traded to the Phoenix Coyotes, where he scored two goals in seventeen games. During the 2004-05 NHL lockout, Novoseltsev split time between HC Spartak Moscow and Lada Togliatti.

Novoseltsev played four games for the American Hockey League's Norfolk Admirals early in the 2006–07 season before returning to Russia again to play for Amur Khabarovsk.

Novoseltsev joined Khimik Voskresensk in 2009, playing 29 games with the team. He remained with the team during the 2009-10 season (as the team was relegated to the second-tier Vysshaya Liga due to financial concerns), scoring five goals and ten points in 40 games. Novoseltsev retired after the 2009-10 MHL season.

Career statistics

Regular season and playoffs

International

References

External links

1979 births
Amur Khabarovsk players
Florida Panthers draft picks
Florida Panthers players
HC Khimik Voskresensk players
HC Lada Togliatti players
HC Spartak Moscow players
Krylya Sovetov Moscow players
Living people
Louisville Panthers players
Norfolk Admirals players
People from Odintsovsky District
Phoenix Coyotes players
Russian ice hockey right wingers
Sarnia Sting players
Springfield Falcons players
Traktor Chelyabinsk players
Sportspeople from Moscow Oblast